Fielder Creek is a stream in the U.S. state of Oregon. It is a tributary to Evans Creek.

Fielder Creek was named after Thomas Fielder, a pioneer citizen.

References

Rivers of Oregon
Rivers of Jackson County, Oregon